Stalagtia is a genus of  woodlouse hunting spiders that was first described by J. Kratochvíl in 1970.

Species
 it contains seven species:
Stalagtia argus Brignoli, 1976 – Greece
Stalagtia christoi Van Keer & Bosmans, 2009 – Greece
Stalagtia hercegovinensis (Nosek, 1905) (type) – SE Europe (Balkans), Turkey
Stalagtia kratochvili Brignoli, 1976 – Greece
Stalagtia monospina (Absolon & Kratochvíl, 1933) – Montenegro
Stalagtia skadarensis Kratochvíl, 1970 – Montenegro
Stalagtia thaleriana Chatzaki & Arnedo, 2006 – Greece (Crete), Turkey

References

Araneomorphae genera
Dysderidae